Totally Spies! is an animated spy-fi series created by Vincent Chalvon-Demersay and David Michel mainly produced by French animation company Marathon Media and French broadcaster TF1, with seasons 3 to 5 being co-produced with Canadian company Image Entertainment Corporation. It focuses on three teenage girls from Beverly Hills, California, who work as undercover agents for the World Organization of Human Protection (WOOHP). This is the first television series to be co-produced by the two production companies, the second being Martin Mystery, and employs an animation style modelled on anime.

Totally Spies! premiered on 3 November 2001 on ABC Family (now Freeform) in the U.S. before moving to Cartoon Network less than two years later. It premiered on TF1 in France on 3 April 2002, and on Teletoon in Canada on 2 September 2002. Since the series' debut, 156 episodes were broadcast, comprising six seasons and several specials. An upcoming seventh season is currently scheduled for a 2023 release.

Several products tied to the series have been released, including various comic books, novels and video games. A prequel feature film, Totally Spies! The Movie, released between the fifth and sixth seasons and co-produced with Italy, was theatrically released in 2009 in France, and later aired in the US on Cartoon Network in 2010.

Premise 
The series focuses around the adventures of three teenage girls from Beverly Hills, USA – Sam, Clover, and Alex – who live a double life as secret agents working for the World Organization of Human Protection (WOOHP). The girls are recruited by the organization's leader, Jerry, to solve worsening crime conditions that arise across the globe. The spies sport colourful latex jumpsuits and are provided with various gadgets to aid in their investigations. Their primary missions involve dealing with disgruntled and vengeful criminals who have been inconvenienced in some form in the past. Other missions have the same villains plotting revenge on the spies by ruining their personal lives. Framing each episode is a subplot that focuses on the girls' everyday lives as high school (and later university) students, dealing with relationships and their longtime high school nemesis Mandy.

Characters 

 Sam (voiced by Claire Guyot in the French version and by Jennifer Hale in the English version) is the intellectual of the trio. She acts as an elder sister to her friends, being rational, logical, and the most mature of the group. More sensible than Alex and less superficial than Clover, her intelligence and composure allow her to find effective solutions to complicated problems.
 Clover (voiced by Fily Keita in the French version and by Andrea Baker in the English version) is the fashionable one of the trio. While she is athletic, agile and strong, she is also impulsive and spontaneous, never thinking twice before jumping into the action. She is always ready to teach villains a lesson, even if she has no chance of winning against them.
 Alex (voiced by Céline Mauge in the French version and by Katie Leigh in Seasons 1–2 and Katie Griffin in Seasons 3–6 in the English version) is the heart of the trio. Though somewhat modest in their presence, she admires Sam and Clover and values her friendship with them above all else, and will do anything to keep the trio united and happy. She is very affectionate and unafraid to show her feelings.
 Jerry (voiced by Jean-Claude Donda in the French version and Jess Harnell in Seasons 1–2 and Adrian Truss in Seasons 3–6 in the English version) is the founder and president of WOOHP and the trio's superior. He is in charge of sending them on missions, and takes a certain pleasure in summoning them at inopportune moments. Despite his age, he is sufficiently athletic when helping the trio on certain missions. He remains attached to his cultural roots and often plays with his British phlegm with the trio, who do not hesitate to tease him about his cheesy gentlemanly demeanor.

Episodes

Development and production 
The series' conception came from the rise of girl groups and female singers in the music industry. Wanting to capitalize on the niche, David Michel and Vincent Chalvon-Demersay put their idea into development, which later shifted into production within a year. According to Michel, the series' animation style was influenced by anime. The production company, Marathon Media, intended on building on the series brand by forming a three-piece girl band, utilizing German talk show Arabella to create it. Using a panel of judges, 20 demo videos were selected and the winners were selected based on the strength of their performance and the series' viewers. The band was selected and released a single in the spring of 2002, through EMI. According to managing director Dirk Fabarius, "The plan is to eventually create an entire album and establish and promote Totally Spies as a real band." While the idea did not materialize, the series was promoted through other merchandising. It was announced in Spring 2001 that the series would air in the fall on ABC Family in the United States, and would be distributed to the European countries in the following year.

In an interview with WorldScreen.com, Michel explained that prior to the series, there were a lot of boy action-adventure shows and practically nothing for girls, yet in pop culture, there was Britney Spears and Spice Girls. He explained that the characters are heavily inspired by the movie Clueless and wanted to mix that with a James Bond format. When they first pitched the show, it had a moderate response, but when the first season was broadcast, the Charlie's Angels film came out, and suddenly the market was full of girl show properties.

According to an article "Achieving a Global Reach on Children's Cultural Markets" by Valerie-Ines de la Ville and Laurent Durup, the series was originally designed to reach an American audience, but has garnered appeal from its humor "based on a stereotypical European vision of American references" while "appearing to be original and innovative to the U.S. audience". Producer and artistic director Stephane Berry explained that the style "is a melting between the American style, which associates action and comedy, and Japanese design for the aesthetic environment and the emotions expressed through the large eyes of the characters." Some of the common references have included Charlie's Angels, Beverly Hills, The Avengers, James Bond and its gadgets, and Cat's Eye.

The head writers for the series were Robert and Michelle Lamoreaux who were based in Los Angeles, and who had worked on Nickelodeon shows. Demersay and Stephane Berry had both recently worked with Saban entertainment in Europe. In a GeoCities interview, Kate Griffin, who voices Alex, mentioned that the typical session for the three girls is that they would record as an ensemble, but through a phone patch, with Hale and Baker calling from Los Angeles, and herself in Toronto.

Following the end of the fifth season, the series's movie, Totally Spies! The Movie, was produced and released to theatres in France on 22 July 2009. The movie received a telecast release in the United States, on 25 April the following year, coinciding with the airing of the series' fifth season there.

In August 2011, Marathon Media confirmed that production for the sixth season was underway and set to premiere in 2013. The sixth series would be produced only by Marathon in association with TF1 and The Walt Disney Company France. It was later confirmed that 26 episodes would be produced and that the series would be licensed in Spain and Latin America, with European territories following suit. To coincide with the sixth season's premiere, Zodiak Kids CP Paris, in association with Château de Versailles Spectacles (CVS) and TF1, organized an event at the Palace of Versailles, taking place during Summer 2013. The event would be preceded with activities including a screening of a special featuring the spies on a mission in the palace gardens.

On 8 January 2022, Thomas Astruc, the creator of Miraculous Ladybug, who had previously worked on Totally Spies!, announced on Twitter that a new season of the latter was "in the making". On the 13th, revised character designs for Sam, Alex and Clover were revealed. It was originally set to premiere in 2023, but it got delayed to 2024. The upcoming series will be produced by Zodiak Kids & Family Studio France, with Ollenom (Production subsidiary of fellow Zodiak Kids & Family subsidiary Monello Productions) as co-producer, and French-broadcaster Gulli and Latin American-broadcaster Discovery Kids as participators.

Telecast and home media 
In the U.S., Totally Spies! premiered on 3 November 2001 on Fox Family/ABC Family (now Freeform). It later premiered in Europe on pay-TV and terrestrial channels such as Germany's ProSieben, France's TF1, United Kingdom's Channel 4 and the localised Fox Kids channels throughout the region during the spring of 2002. The show was moved to Cartoon Network in July 2003 in the United States, where it attracted 1.6 million viewers (aged 4–10) daily and continued airing until 10 September 2010. In 2019, the show aired weeknights on the Universal Kids channel, which broadcast the show's sixth season for the first time in the United States.

Totally Spies! has attracted over one million viewers in France since its debut. It was re-licensed and its sixth season, along with Totally Spies! The Movie and the show's spin off The Amazing Spiez!. The show aired its sixth season in France and is being aired around Europe. In Canada, season 6 began airing on 7 September 2014 on Teletoon, and on 6 September on Télétoon. The show has been aired worldwide on various networks, such as TF1 in France; Teletoon in Canada, Fox Family/ABC Family, Cartoon Network, Universal Kids in the US; Fox Kids, Jetix, Cartoon Network, and Boomerang in Latin America and Brazil on pay-TV; Rede Globo in Brazil on terrestrial TV; ABS-CBN in the Philippines on terrestrial TV; ART Teenz, MBC 3 in the Middle East; Dragon Club in China; TVB in Hong Kong; Fox Kids, Jetix, Disney Channel, and Nickelodeon channels in Europe,  Africa, Asia and Oceania. In Australia, it was shown on Network Ten and later on 10 Peach (formerly Eleven) as part of their Toasted TV block. Seasons 3–4 was aired on POP in the United Kingdom from 2013. Season 5 started airing in 2015 and season 6 the following year in 2016. It was also briefly aired on its sister network, Pop Girl. It was aired on BBC Alba in Scotland. Season 1 aired on Disney Channel and Disney XD. It aired in Ireland on RTÉ Two from 11 September 2002 until 2009.

Since 2012, the show has had an official YouTube channel that has uploaded the majority of the episodes and even the film, and normally uploads random clips every Saturday. As of 24 April 2021, all six seasons of Totally Spies! are also available on Amazon Prime Video, which currently has the exclusive streaming rights in the U.S.

In the year of 2004, Goodtimes Entertainment released the first twelve episodes of the show's first season on VHS and DVD in three volumes: Totally Spies Volume 1: First Secret Missions, Totally Spies Volume 2: The Getaway, and Totally Spies Volume 3: Spies Attack. Coinciding with the production and release of the show's sixth season, New Video Group/Flatiron Film Company acquired US DVD rights for the series as well as some digital rights for the first three seasons of the series. They've released the first and second seasons (in two volumes each), as well as a box set containing seasons one through three. The third season was finally released in two volumes on 14 January 2014. As of 2020, these DVD sets are now out of print and very hard to find. Totally Spies DVDs are also released in the United Kingdom by Sanctuary Visual Entertainment in 2005 and 2006, Totally Spies – First Secret Missions and Totally Spies – Spy Gladiators. This is released on DVD & Blu-ray in the U.S. by Universal Pictures Home Entertainment.

Reception 
Joly Herman of Common Sense Media gave the series a mixed review, rating the show 3 out of 5 stars and writing that "We think it's a decent show to catch once in a while, but anything more regular might give viewers the like, slightest headache." Joe Corey of Inside Pulse had a more positive review, calling the show "fun enough for small kids who want a Charlie's Angels undercover action show. The trio does their best to balance the fun of being in the espionage game without it being too risky." Matt Hinrichs of DVD Talk gave a positive review, calling the action in the first three seasons "decently written enough for adults to enjoy."

After four seasons, the show had reached over 130 countries and was met with enthusiasm among ages 6–11 that included both girls and boys, and had a Pokémon-like appeal to a broad range of age and gender. In an interview before season three, David Michel said, "The one thing that surprised us the most is the consistency in the male / female viewership split: from Brazil to Italy, we have a 50% boys 50% girls audience ratio, whereas everybody was predicting the show would score very low on boys." Scott Stoute of ScreenRant listed the show among his "10 Girl Cartoons (That Guys Secretly Love)" list.

Controversy 
The Parents Television Council, in their March 2006 report, noted that the show did not contain offensive language but expressed concern about the "nature of the violence of the show" in an episode where rats were released to psychologically torture Jerry and Clover, and the sexual content exampled by a sunblock ad by a bikini-clad woman.

Merchandise

Video games 
The Totally Spies series was initially followed up with two video games titled Totally Spies! and Totally Spies! 2: Undercover. Both were developed by Mistic Software and published by Atari for the Nintendo Game Boy Advance and/or Nintendo DS. IGN rated Totally Spies! 2: Undercover with a score of 4.0/10 citing poor overall game presentation. Totally Spies! 3: Secret Agents was released in Europe and Australia for the Nintendo DS. Totally Spies! Totally Party was released in North America, Europe and Australia for the PlayStation 2, Wii and PC.

Spin-off and crossover 
A spin-off series called The Amazing Spiez! features new characters as spies, retaining Jerry as a regular character in the show. While the series focuses on four young teenage siblings—Lee, Megan, Marc, and Tony Clark, the three spy girls make an appearance on the crossover episode "Operation: Dude Ranch Disaster" from season 1. The show had its world premiere on 15 March 2009, on Disney Channel Asia; and its US premiere on 26 April 2010, on Cartoon Network. In Canada, the show premiered on 2 September 2010 on Teletoon. Only the first season and ten Season 2 episodes aired in the US.

Totally Spies! also had a crossover episode in season 5 titled "Totally Mystery Much?" with Martin Mystery, a Marathon-produced series that aired from 2003 to 2006.

Comics and books 
Totally Spies! comics were released monthly in Sweden. Five books with about 90 pages came out in Brazil as well. Each book represents an episode from the series. There is another comic called Totally Spies Unleashed; this opens with "I Hate the 80s!", in which a bad guy, Boogie Gus, has invented a retro ray that de-ages people. The second story, "Attack of the 50 Ft. Mandy", turns their nemesis into a giant in a plot that involves a beauty contest and an escaped evil scientist. Chapter books have also been released.

Notes

References

External links 

 
 

 
2000s Canadian animated comedy television series
2000s Canadian animated television series
2000s Canadian high school television series
2000s French animated television series
2001 Canadian television series debuts
2001 French television series debuts
2002 Canadian television series debuts
2002 French television series debuts
2010s Canadian high school television series
2010s French animated television series
2013 French television series endings
2015 Canadian television series endings
Anime-influenced Western animated television series
Banijay franchises
Canadian children's animated action television series
Canadian children's animated adventure television series
Canadian children's animated comedy television series
Canadian television series revived after cancellation
English-language television shows
Espionage television series
Fiction about memory erasure and alteration
Fiction about mind control
Fictional Muay Thai practitioners
French children's animated action television series
French children's animated adventure television series
French children's animated comedy television series
Teen animated television series
Teletoon original programming
Television controversies in Canada
Television controversies in France
Television series by Banijay
Television series by Image Entertainment Corporation
Television series revived after cancellation
Television shows adapted into video games
Television shows set in Beverly Hills, California
Television shows set in Malibu, California
TF1 original programming